Jill Katherine Underly ( Semko; born August 2, 1977) is an American educator and school system administrator.  She is the Superintendent of Public Instruction of the U.S. state of Wisconsin, elected in the 2021 Spring general election.

Biography
Jill Underly grew up in northwest Indiana, outside Chicago.  She earned her bachelor's degree from Indiana University Bloomington in 1999, with a double-major in history and sociology.

Immediately after earning her degree, she went to work as a high school social studies teacher at Frankfort High School and Munster High School, in Frankfort and Munster, Indiana, respectively.  While teaching, she pursued further education, and, in 2004, received her first master's degree in secondary education curriculum and instruction from Indiana University–Purdue University Indianapolis.

In 2005, she moved to Madison, Wisconsin, where she continued her education at the University of Wisconsin–Madison and worked on the staff for Undergraduate Academic Services in the College of Letters & Sciences.  She earned her second master's degree in 2008 in Educational Administration and licensure in Educational Administration.

In 2009, she was hired by the Wisconsin Department of Public Instruction as an assistant director and education consultant, where she remained until 2014.  During these years, she continued her education at the University of Wisconsin, and, in 2012, earned her doctorate in educational leadership & policy analysis.

In 2014, she moved to Hollandale, Wisconsin, to become principal of Pecatonica Elementary School.  The following year, the Pecatonica Area School Board selected her as school district administrator.  During her term, Underly was outspoken for the interests of rural school districts.

In May 2020, following the announcement that incumbent State Superintendent Carolyn Stanford Taylor would not seek election to a full four-year term, Underly announced her candidacy for State Superintendent of Public Instruction.

Underly topped a field of seven candidates in the February 2021 nonpartisan primary, and went on to defeat former Brown Deer superintendent Deborah Kerr in the April general election. Underly received the endorsements of retired Republican state senator Dale Schultz, Democratic U.S. senator Tammy Baldwin, U.S. representatives Ron Kind, Gwen Moore, and Mark Pocan, former Governor Jim Doyle, and nearly every Democrat in the Wisconsin Legislature. Her opponent, a proponent of voucher school expansion, was endorsed by former U.S. Secretary of Education Arne Duncan and Democratic state senator Lena Taylor.

Personal life and family
Underly and her husband John live in Hollandale, Wisconsin; they have two children.

Electoral history

Wisconsin Superintendent of Public Instruction (2021)

| colspan="6" style="text-align:center;background-color: #e9e9e9;"| Nonpartisan Primary, February 16, 2021

| colspan="6" style="text-align:center;background-color: #e9e9e9;"| General Election, April 6, 2021

References

External links
 
 Campaign website (Archived January 26, 2021)
 Jill Underly, PhD at Pecatonica Area School District (Archived January 21, 2021)

21st-century American politicians
21st-century American women politicians
Date of birth uncertain
Educators from Indiana
Educators from Wisconsin
Indiana University Bloomington alumni
Indiana University–Purdue University Indianapolis alumni
Living people
People from Iowa County, Wisconsin
University of Wisconsin–Madison alumni
Superintendents of Public Instruction of Wisconsin
Year of birth missing (living people)